Roaschia is a comune (municipality) in the Province of Cuneo in the Italian region Piedmont, located about  south of Turin and about  southwest of Cuneo.

Roaschia borders the following municipalities: Entracque, Robilante, Roccavione, Valdieri, and Vernante.

References

Cities and towns in Piedmont